Alvaro Sanabria (born 5 May 1963) is a Costa Rican judoka. He competed at the 1980 Summer Olympics and the 1984 Summer Olympics.

References

1963 births
Living people
Costa Rican male judoka
Olympic judoka of Costa Rica
Judoka at the 1980 Summer Olympics
Judoka at the 1984 Summer Olympics
Place of birth missing (living people)